Hermeyak (also Romanized as Ḩermeyak, Harmīk, Ḩarm-e Yak, and Ḩermīak; also known as Charmek) is a village in Tashan Rural District, Riz District, Jam County, Bushehr Province, Iran. At the 2006 census, its population was 153, in 34 families.

References 

Populated places in Jam County